"We Can Leave the World" is a song recorded by German singer Sasha. It was written by Pete Smith, Michael "Grant Michael B." Kersting, and Stephan "Pomez di Lorenzo" Baader for Sasha's debut studio album Dedicated to... (1998), while production was overseen by the latter two. Released as the album's third single, the song became a top ten success in Austria, Germany, and Switzerland.

Credits and personnel 
Credits adapted from the liner notes of Dedicated to...

Music and lyrics – Pomez di Lorenzo, Grant Michael B.
Lead and backing vocals – Sasha
Mixing – Falk Moller, Michael B.

Charts

Weekly charts

Year-end charts

References

External links 
 

1999 singles
1998 songs
Sasha (German singer) songs